Joseph Aloysius Ruddy Sr. (September 28, 1878 – November 11, 1962) was an American competition swimmer and water polo player who represented the United States at the 1904 Summer Olympics in St. Louis, Missouri.  Ruddy won a gold medal as a member of the winning U.S. team in the men's 4x50-yard freestyle relay.  He won a second gold medal as a member of the first-place U.S. water polo team.

Ruddy was the father of 1928 Olympic swimmer Ray Ruddy, and two other sons and two daughters.  His oldest son and namesake, Joseph Ruddy, Jr. was a U.S. Navy admiral.

He died at home in 1962; he was 84 years old.

In 1977, he was inducted into the USA Water Polo Hall of Fame.

See also
 List of members of the International Swimming Hall of Fame
 List of athletes with Olympic medals in different disciplines
 List of Olympic medalists in swimming (men)

References

External links
 

1878 births
1962 deaths
Sportspeople from New York City
American male freestyle swimmers
American male water polo players
Olympic gold medalists for the United States in swimming
Swimmers at the 1904 Summer Olympics
Water polo players at the 1904 Summer Olympics
Medalists at the 1904 Summer Olympics
Olympic gold medalists for the United States in water polo
American water polo coaches